The Roman Catholic Church in Hungary is composed of:
 A Latin hierarchy, comprising 
 four ecclesiastical provinces, comprising their Metropolitan archdioceses and in total nine suffragan dioceses
 the exempt Military Ordinariate
 the exempt Territorial Archabbey of Pannonhalma.  
 The overlapping proper province of the Hungarian Greek Catholic Church (Eastern Catholic sui iuris, Byzantine Rite in Hungarian)

There is also an Apostolic nunciature, the papal diplomatic representation in Hungary.

Current Latin Dioceses (Roman Rite)

Exempt Sui iuris Jurisdictions 
directly subject to the Holy See
 Military Ordinariate of Hungary (Tábori Püspökség)
 Territorial Abbey of Pannonhalma

 Ecclesiastical Province of Esztergom–Budapest 
 Metropolitan Archdiocese of Esztergom–Budapest, primatial see of Hungary 
Diocese of Győr 
Diocese of Székesfehérvár

 Ecclesiastical Province of Eger 
 Metropolitan Archdiocese of Eger 
Diocese of Debrecen–Nyíregyháza 
Diocese of Vác

 Ecclesiastical Province of Kalocsa–Kecskemét 
 Metropolitan Archdiocese of Kalocsa–Kecskemét 
Diocese of Pécs 
Diocese of Szeged–Csanád

 Ecclesiastical Province of Veszprém 
 Metropolitan Archdiocese of Veszprém 
Diocese of Kaposvár 
Diocese of Szombathely

 Current Eastern Catholic dioceses 

 Hungarian (Greek) Catholic province 
 Metropolitan Hungarian Catholic Archeparchy of Hajdúdorog (Metropolitan see sui iuris'', in chief of the entire Hungarian language Byzantine Rite church)
Hungarian Catholic Eparchy of Miskolc
Hungarian Catholic Eparchy of Nyíregyháza

Defunct jurisdictions 
There is no titular see.

All former jurisdictions have a current successor.

Sources and external links 
 GCatholic.org.
 Catholic-Hierarchy entry.

Hungary
Catholic dioceses